Mary A. Wolfe House is a registered historic building in Cincinnati, Ohio, listed in the National Register on March 3, 1980.

It is one of multiple places associated with architect Samuel Hannaford that were listed on the National Register as part of a 1978 Thematic Resource study.

The house was demolished in 2019.

References

National Register of Historic Places in Cincinnati
Houses in Cincinnati
Houses on the National Register of Historic Places in Ohio
Houses completed in 1888